Kim Mee-hyang (Hangul: 김미향; born 1 October 1973) is a South Korean retired badminton player. She was part of the Korea Tobacco & Ginseng Corporation team. In 1995, she won her first international title at the Swedish Open in the women's doubles event partnered with Kim Shin-young. Together with Kim Shin-young, they were ranked as World No. 9 and competed at the 1996 Atlanta Olympic Games.

Achievements

World Cup 
Women's doubles

Asian Championships 
Mixed doubles

Asian Cup 
Mixed doubles

East Asian Games 
Mixed doubles

IBF World Grand Prix 
The World Badminton Grand Prix sanctioned by International Badminton Federation (IBF) since 1983.

Women's doubles

Mixed doubles

References

External links 
 
 

1973 births
Living people
South Korean female badminton players
Badminton players at the 1996 Summer Olympics
Olympic badminton players of South Korea
20th-century South Korean women